TV 1860 Fürth is a multi-sport club from Fürth, Germany. Among others the club has had sections for athletics, football, handball, tennis and fencing.

Athletics
The athletics section founded the club LAC Quelle Fürth in 1969.

Football

The football section founded the club SG Quelle Fürth in 1973.

External links 
 TV Fürth 1860 website 

Sports clubs established in 1860
Sport in Fürth
1860 establishments in Germany
Defunct football clubs in Germany